The High Commissioner of the United Kingdom to Tonga was the United Kingdom's diplomatic representative to the Kingdom of Tonga from 1973 until 2006. In March 2006 the British Government closed its High Commission in Nukuʻalofa; British interests in Tonga are now represented by the British High Commissioner in Fiji. However, the High Commission is to reopen in 2019 with a resident High Commissioner.

List of heads of mission

High Commissioners to Tonga

1973–1980: Humphrey Arthington-Davy
1980–1983: Bernard Coleman
1984–1987: Gerald Rance
1987–1990: Paul Fabian
1990–1994: William Cordiner
1994–1998: Andrew Morris
1999–2001: Brian Connelly
2002–2006: Paul Nessling
2019–2020: Robin Ord-Smith

2020–present: Thorhilda Abbott-Watt

See also

List of British consuls in Tonga

References

External links

Tonga, British High Commission, Suva – Foreign & Commonwealth Office

Tonga
United Kingdom
United Kingdom
Tonga and the Commonwealth of Nations
United Kingdom and the Commonwealth of Nations